Iowa Highway 220 (Iowa 220) is a short state highway through the Amana Colonies in east-central Iowa.  Along with U.S. Highway 6 (US 6) and US 151, it is part of the circuitous Amana Colonies Trail scenic byway.  Iowa 220 begins at US 6 in South Amana and ends at US 151 in Amana.

Route description
Iowa Highway 220 begins at an intersection with US 6 in South Amana  It heads north into South Amana where it goes through an S-curve before crossing an Iowa Interstate Railroad line.  North of South Amana, Iowa 220 crosses the Iowa River and Mill Race, which powered mills in the Amana Colonies.

At West Amana, Iowa 220 turns east onto an east–west alignment.  It moves through High Amana and turns to the south-southeast towards Middle Amana, where it passes the Amana Corporation manufacturing facility.  From Middle Amana, it turns to the northeast and then to the east as it enters Amana, ending at a four-way stop with US 151.

History
Iowa 220 was created in the early 1930s as a spur route from West Amana to Amana. By 1947, Iowa 220 ran from South Amana to Amana along the current extent of the route. The western end of the route was pulled back to its current western end in 1976. Four years later, its eastern end was truncated back to the intersection with Iowa 149 in Amana. In 1985, Iowa 149 was replaced by US 151 between Cedar Rapids and Interstate 80.

Major intersections

References

External links

220
Transportation in Iowa County, Iowa